The Men's slalom competition of the Innsbruck 1976 Olympics was held at Axamer Lizum on Saturday, 14 February.

The defending world champion was Gustav Thöni of Italy, while Sweden's Ingemar Stenmark was the defending World Cup slalom champion and the leader of the 1976 World Cup.

Results

References 

Men's slalom
Winter Olympics
Men's slalom